George N. Turner was the 23rd Chief of Police for the City of Atlanta, Georgia, USA. Turner assumed the position as interim chief on January 4, 2010, having been appointed by newly inaugurated Mayor Kasim Reed due to the resignation of Richard Pennington shortly after the Atlanta Eagle police raid. Turner became the permanent police chief on July 9, 2010.

Turner began his career with the Atlanta Police Department in 1981.

In December 2016, Turner announced his retirement. Mayor Reed chose Deputy Chief, Erika Shields as his successor. Shields became chief on December 28, 2016.

Education
Turner was educated in the Atlanta public school system. He has a bachelor's degree from Saint Leo University and a Master of Public Administration degree from Columbus State University.

References 
Strategic Move: CSU Master’s Degree Equips Atlanta Police Chief

Living people
People from Atlanta
Chiefs of the Atlanta Police Department
Saint Leo University alumni
Columbus State University alumni
Year of birth missing (living people)